Jeepers Creepers: Reborn is a 2022 supernatural horror film directed by Timo Vuorensola (in his American debut) and written by Jake Seal and Sean-Michael Argo. The film is a reboot of Victor Salva's Jeepers Creepers trilogy intended to set up a new trilogy. Starring Sydney Craven and Imran Adams, with "special appearances" from Dee Wallace and Gary Graham, it was released worldwide by Screen Media Films (alongside 101 Films in the UK) on September 19, 2022.

The film was critically panned and became the subject of a lawsuit by Myriad Pictures, who claim ownership of the rights after producing the previous films, and were not notified of the film's production.

Plot
An elderly couple is driving through the Florida countryside when an old truck tailgates them before passing. They observe the driver next to an abandoned church placing what appears to be a body wrapped in a blood-stained sheet into a large pipe sticking out of the ground. After the truck causes them to run off the road, they turn around to investigate the pipe and are horrified by what is inside.

In 2021, millennial couple Chase and Laine travel to the Horror Hound festival in rural Louisiana. Chase is a paranormal fanatic, taking a special interest in the local urban legend of "the Creeper", a creature that every 23 years, for 23 days, kills and eats hundreds of people before disappearing. Chase plans to propose marriage to Laine on their trip, and unbeknownst to him, Laine believes she is pregnant. Meanwhile, the Creeper awakens and begins to feed in order to increase its strength. Stopping at a gift shop, Laine has a premonition when she touches a mysterious artifact. Owner Lady Manilla gives cryptic messages to the couple. At the hotel, Laine takes a pregnancy test but is interrupted when a crow slams into the window. The couple then depart for the festival.

At Horror Hound, Laine picks up a mysterious shuriken and finds she is abnormally skilled at throwing it. The Creeper arrives and begins hunting; using its truck, it knocks out internet connectivity. The couple enters into a raffle hosted by festival organizer Madam Carnage, for a chance to win a night at an abandoned plantation house that has been converted into an escape room. Laine begins to have visions of her involvement in a strange ritual within the house. A cameraman and associated crew accompanies them to document the event, along with a local tour guide, Stu.

As the group approaches the house, they travel through an 18th century graveyard where the Creeper kills the cameraman and abducts Laine as Chase proposes to her. Laine awakens bound to a table where the Creeper pierces her abdomen with a knife. The group enters the house and feuds over their situation; Stu fires his pistol into the air attracting the Creeper's attention. The Creeper leaves Laine and hunts the group throughout the house, eventually killing all of them save for Stu and Chase. 

Laine frees herself and joins them; she reveals to Chase that she is pregnant and that the Creeper has specifically targeted her as a result. They discover that Madam Carnage, Lady Manilla, and others have been worshiping the Creeper and luring victims to the house for its consumption. They enact a plan for Laine to lure the Creeper outside so Chase and Stu can push the steeple onto it. Laine blinds the Creeper with its shuriken, and the falling steeple impales it. A murder of crows consume the Creeper and fly into the night. The group departs, while elsewhere the Creeper regenerates and unleashes a devilish roar.

Cast
 Sydney Craven as Laine
 Imran Adams as Chase
 Dee Wallace as Marie
 Gary Graham as Ronald
 Pete Brooke as Stu
 Ocean Navarro as Carrie
 Matt Barkley as Jamie
 Alexander Halsall as Michael
 Jodie McMullen as Madame Carnage
 Jarreau Benjamin as The Creeper
 Georgia Goodman as Lady Manilla
 Gabriel Freilich as Sam
 Romain Faure as DJ Phython

Production

An international co-production film between the United Kingdom, United States and Finland. Principal photography commenced for three days in Jackson, Louisiana, on location and at Orwo Studios. Soon after, the production was moved to the United Kingdom. Due to the COVID-19 pandemic, filming in the UK was split into two parts. The first began on November 23, 2020, at Black Hangar Studios, and finished on December 19. The second took place for eight days between January and February 2021. The film's title was officially confirmed as Jeepers Creepers: Reborn in February 2021, when Screen Media Films acquired worldwide distribution rights, after previously releasing Jeepers Creepers 3 (2017). At the 2021 European Film Market, Foresight Unlimited showed a promotional reel of footage for international sales.

Release
Jeepers Creepers: Reborn was released in select theaters in the United States from September 19 to September 21, 2022, by Screen Media Films, in partnership with Fathom Events. Screen Media also holds worldwide distribution rights, excluding the United Kingdom where 101 Films releases in partnership with Foresight Unlimited (owned by Screen Media) and released via video-on-demand and home media physical release.

Legal issues
In March 16, 2021, Myriad Pictures, the production company behind Jeepers Creepers 2 (2003) and Jeepers Creepers 3, filed a property fraud lawsuit against Infinity Films Holdings, one of the film's production companies, for producing the film without Myriad's "knowledge or involvement" and selling the distribution rights to Screen Media Films.

Reception
Critical response to Jeepers Creepers: Reborn were negative, with critics panning the film's production values, lack of scares, and performances and is considered to be one the worst horror films and among the worst films ever made.

Phil Hoad of The Guardian called the film a "shoddy, aesthetically ugly reboot", criticizing the film's poorly-written script and unconvincing production values. The Sydney Morning Heralds Paul Byrnes echoed Hoad's sentiment, noting the poor performances and complete lack of tension severely damaged the overall film, calling the film vastly inferior to the previous entries in the franchise. Joel Harley from Starburst Magazine rated the film two out of ten stars, calling it "dull and forgettable", further calling attention to the low production values and predictable script.

See also
 List of films considered the worst

References

External links
 
 Promotional website
 Jeepers Creepers: Reborn at Screen Media Films
 

Jeepers Creepers (film series)
American horror films
American monster movies
British horror films
British monster movies
Finnish horror films
Films shot in Louisiana
Films impacted by the COVID-19 pandemic
Reboot films
Films directed by Timo Vuorensola
2020s monster movies
2020s American films
2020s British films
2022 horror films